House of Yes may refer to:
The House of Yes (play), a play written by Wendy MacLeod
The House of Yes, a 1997 film based on the play
House of Yes: Live from House of Blues, live album by prog-rock band Yes
House of Yes (Brooklyn), a nightclub in Brooklyn, New York, USA